Lepa Brena: Godine Slatkog greha is a 2017 documentary film about Bosnian singer Lepa Brena. The film documents the events since the beginning of Brena's career in 1982 until the breakup of Yugoslavia in 1991.

Synopsis
The biggest Balkan star Lepa Brena in the documentary speaks about the famous but also reveals and yet unknown details from her biography. From childhood in Brčko, growing up in the working family to the achievement of the most successful career in the former Yugoslavia. How she built the brand, what was the role of her manager Raka Đokić, in the success of Lepa Brena and Slatki greh and how it looked like a tour that lasted for 9 years. The film is featured by prominent artists and public workers of a time brought by artists like Lepa Brena today. The film begins with her anecdote from the elementary school when an unknown man predicted her great popularity and would be known as Tito. For Brena, this documentary is an emotional story about her life, a reminder of the time in which we all lived happily and in which they wanted to portray sociological, cultural and economic opportunities at that time. "I wanted to show how it looked between 1982 and 1991 when we were "Slatki greh" and I worked two concerts a day and recorded four films. With special emotions I remember how it was to work with top actors, but also how it was with 20, 30, and even 50 men on the bus for years on tour. They were my family. This is a story about how to start from a small place, like a girl from the province, doing great things and staying dignified in your business" — said Lepa Brena. In the eighties Lepa Brena and "Slatki greh" were the most influential performers in the history of Yugoslav discography, selling up to one million copies per album. They are also world record holders in the number of concerts held at the Dom sindikata during concert residency Lepa Brena Live at Dom sindikata, where they performed for 31 days without end.

Cast

Lepa Brena
Slobodan Živojinović, husband
Stefan Živojinović, son
Filip Živojinović, son
Viktor Živojinović, son
Ljubiša Marković Frenki, musician (member of the "Slatki greh")
Živojin Matić Žile, musician (member of the "Slatki greh")
Branislav Mijatović Mija, musician (member of the "Slatki greh")
Saša Popović, musician (member of the "Slatki greh")
Zoran Radanov Zoki, musician (member of the "Slatki greh")
Marina Tucaković, songwriter
Dragan Bjelogrlić, actor
Mirjana Bobić Mojsilović, actress and writer
Svetlana Ceca Ražnatović, singer
Tereza Kesovija, singer
Vlado Kalember, singer
Alen Islamović, singer
Milutin Popović Zahar, composer
Stanko Crnobrnja, television and film director, producer and screenwriter
Emir Hadžihafizbegović, actor
Marko Janković, journalist, radio and television host
Ivana Žigon, actress
Eva Ras, actress
Danica Maksimović, actress
Mima Karadžić, actor

References

External links
 

2017 films
Serbian documentary films
Documentary films about singers
Documentary films about women in music
Lepa Brena
Cultural depictions of Lepa Brena